Huangdi Township is a township in Longhua County, Hebei, China. , it administers the following 17 villages:
Xi Village
Dong Village
Dengchang Village
Yingtaogoumen Village
Ergoumen Village
Pingdingshan Village
Shaoguoying Village
Yingfang Village
Liangdi Village
Xiaohougou Village
Shangguanying Village
Dahougou Village
Shihugoumen Village
Maojikou Village
Erdaowan Village
Linggoumen Village
Luanjiawan Village

References 

Township-level divisions of Hebei
Longhua County